Mosheka ol Din (also Romanized as Moshekā ol Dīn; also known as Mogh Shekāleddīn and Mogh Shekāl od Dīn) is a village in Bondar Rural District, Senderk District, Minab County, Hormozgan Province, Iran. At the 2006 census, its population was 18, in 6 families.

References 

Populated places in Minab County